Color Bars (カラーバー) is an EP by Japanese rock band Tokyo Jihen, released on January 18, 2012 in Japan through EMI Music Japan and Virgin Music. The album was produced by the band and Japanese recording engineer Uni Inoue.

The first press edition is a cardboard sleeve.

Background 
The album's cover art is a combination of many "color bars", which is a representation of SMPTE color bars. They suggested the end of the band by it, since color bars fill the telescreen after all the TV programs for the day finish in Japan.

This mini album, intended to be the band's final studio release, includes one song written by each band member, including Toshiki Hata's first composition for the band and the first time Seiji Kameda wrote lyrics for his own song. In addition, the lead vocals on "Kai Horror Dust" and "Honto no Tokoro" were provided by the songs' respective composers, while Ringo Shiina played drums on the latter track. As in Dai Hakken, each song title is made up of seven characters.

Track listing

All the official European language titles according to Ringo Shiina's website.

Charts and certifications

Charts

Sales and certifications

Notes and references

External links 
Tokyo Jihen Discography

Tokyo Jihen albums
2012 albums
EMI Records EPs
Virgin Records EPs